James Chester (30 May 1823 – 23 June 1888) was an English first-class cricketer active 1846–59 who played for Surrey. He was born in Kingston-upon-Thames and died in Wimbledon. He was an all-rounder and played in 45 first-class matches.

References

1823 births
1888 deaths
English cricketers
Surrey cricketers
All-England Eleven cricketers
Married v Single cricketers
Marylebone Cricket Club cricketers
Non-international England cricketers
North v South cricketers
Players cricketers
Fast v Slow cricketers